The U.S. House Committee on the Judiciary, also called the House Judiciary Committee, is a standing committee of the United States House of Representatives. It is charged with overseeing the administration of justice within the federal courts, federal administrative agencies, and federal law enforcement entities. The Judiciary Committee is often involved in the impeachment process against federal officials. Because of the legal nature of its oversight, committee members usually have a legal background, but this is not required.

In the 118th Congress, the chairman of the committee is Republican Jim Jordan of Ohio, and the ranking minority member is Democrat Jerry Nadler of New York.

History 

The committee was created on June 3, 1813, for the purpose of considering legislation related to the judicial system. This committee approved impeachment resolutions/articles of impeachment against presidents in four instances: against Andrew Johnson (in 1867), Richard Nixon (in 1974), Bill Clinton (in 1998), and Donald Trump (in 2019).

In the 115th Congress, the chairman of the committee was Republican Bob Goodlatte of Virginia, and the ranking minority member was initially Democrat John Conyers of Michigan. On November 26, 2017, Conyers stepped down from his position as ranking member, while he faced an ethics investigation. On November 28, 2017, Jerrold Nadler of New York was named as acting ranking member.

In the 116th Congress, the House flipped from Republican to Democratic control. Doug Collins, a Republican from Georgia's 9th congressional district, became ranking member and served from 2019 to 2020. In early 2020, Collins stepped down from his leadership position when he became a candidate in the 2020 special election held to replace retiring U.S. Senator Johnny Isakson. Under House Republican rules, members must relinquish leadership positions if they launch a bid for another office. Collins was succeeded as ranking member by Jordan, who represents Ohio's 4th congressional district, but who has never taken a bar examination or practiced law.

Predecessor committees 
 Claims: Functions merged in 1946
 Immigration and Naturalization: Functions merged in 1946
 Internal Security: Functions merged in 1975
 Un-American Activities: Functions merged into Internal Security in 1969
 Patents: Functions merged in 1946
 Revision of Laws: Functions merged in 1946
 War Claims: Functions merged in 1946

Members, 118th Congress 

Resolutions electing members:  (Chair),  (Ranking Member),  (R),  (D)

Subcommittees

List of chairs

Historical membership rosters

116th Congress

Sources:  (Chair),  (Ranking Member),  (D),  (R),  (R),  (R)

Subcommittees

115th Congress 

114th Congress 

Sources:

112th Congress 

Sources:
 Resolutions electing Republican members:  (Chair),  (Members)
 Resolutions electing Democratic members  (Ranking member),  (Members)

111th Congress

Task forces

Antitrust Task Force: 108th Congress 
Chairman: Jim Sensenbrenner (R-WI); Ranking member: John Conyers (D-MI)

The Antitrust Task Force during the 108th Congress existed from March 26, 2003, to September 26, 2003. All Judiciary Committee Members also served as members of the Task Force, and conducted hearings and investigations into consolidation of the Bell Telephone Companies.

Antitrust Task Force: 110th Congress 
Chairman: John Conyers (D-MI); Ranking member: Steve Chabot (R-OH)

The Antitrust Task Force during the 110th Congress was established February 28, 2007, as a temporary subcommittee to examine the pending merger between XM Radio and Sirius Satellite Radio. The task force operated like any other subcommittee, except that it only has a six-month term. House Rules limit each full committee to just five subcommittees, and any task force, special subcommittee, or other subunit of a standing committee that is established for a cumulative period longer than six months in a Congress counts against that total. A longer term for the task force would cause the Judiciary Committee to exceed this limit.

Judicial Impeachment: 110th and 111th Congresses 
Chairman: Adam Schiff (D-CA) Ranking member: Bob Goodlatte  (R-VA)

Established in September 2008, the Judicial Task force on Judicial Impeachment was to look into charges against District Judge Thomas Porteous. The investigation was not completed by the end of the 110th Congress, and it was reestablished after the 111th Congress convened in January 2009. The responsibilities of the Task Force were expanded to include the case of Judge Samuel B. Kent, leading to hearings and his subsequent impeachment by the full House of Representatives. The Task force finally voted to impeach Porteous on January 21, 2010.

Projects 
 Administrative Law, Process and Procedure Project (2005–2006)

Hearings 
 The Use and Misuse of Presidential Clemency Power for Executive Branch Officials (hearing) (2007)
 Equal Justice for Our Military Act of 2009, HR 569 (111th Congress) (2009). Congress holds a hearing to consider granting members of the U.S. Armed Forces access to the Supreme Court of the United States.

See also 
 List of United States House committees
 United States congressional committee
 United States Senate Committee on the Judiciary
 List of current United States House of Representatives committees

References

External links 
 Committee on the Judiciary website (Archive) 
 House Judiciary Committee. Legislation activity and reports, Congress.gov. 
 Congressional Directory including lists of past memberships
 House Document No. 109-153, A History of the Committee on the Judiciary 1813–2006

Judiciary
Law of the United States
1813 establishments in the United States
Organizations established in 1813
Parliamentary committees on Justice